"L'amour existe encore" (meaning "Love Still Exists") is a song by Quebec songwriter Luc Plamondon and Italian composer Riccardo Cocciante. It's sung by Canadian singer Celine Dion, recorded for her French-language album, Dion chante Plamondon (1991). It was released simultaneously with "Des mots qui sonnent" as the lead promotional single in Canada in November 1991 and third commercial single in France in January 1994. Dion also recorded a Spanish-language version of this song, called "Aun Existe Amor" for her 2002 album A New Day Has Come, which was released as a promotional single in the United States in 2002.

Background and release
"L'amour existe encore" was released in Canada with no accompanying video. When Sony Music Entertainment decided to issue a commercial single in France, there was a music video made in December 1993. It was directed by Alain Desrochers. The video was featured later on the On ne change pas DVD (2005).

"L'amour existe encore" entered the Quebec Airplay Chart on 18 November 1991 and reached number 16, staying on the chart for twenty weeks. In France, "L'amour existe encore" peaked at number 31 (twenty three weeks on chart).

In 1994, the music video for "L'amour existe encore" was nominated for the Video of the Year at the Félix Awards.

Live versions of "L'amour existe encore" can be found on À l'Olympia, Au cœur du stade, and Tournée mondiale Taking Chances: le spectacle. The song became also a part of Dion's compilation On ne change pas. Dion performed it during her 2008-09 Taking Chances World Tour and her historic performance in front of 250,000 spectators to celebrate Quebec's 400th anniversary, which was included on Céline sur les Plaines DVD in 2008. The latter was performed as a duet with Éric Lapointe, and included later also on his album Ailleurs - Volume 1, released on 28 April 2009. In May 2009, this duet entered the Top 40 of the Canadian Adult Contemporary chart and Top 10 of the Quebec chart. The song was also performed in Quebec City in July 2013 during the Celine... une seule fois concert; the performance is included in the Céline une seule fois / Live 2013 CD/DVD. Dion also performed "L'amour existe encore" during her Summer Tour 2016 and during selected dates of her Courage World Tour.

In 2021, the alternate and unreleased music video by Cinoque Films Inc. was found in some Sony comp reel.

Spanish version
After Ignacio Ballesteros-Diaz wrote Spanish lyrics, Dion recorded Spanish version of that song, called "Aún Existe Amor". It was featured on her A New Day Has Come album in 2002, and released as a promotional single in the U.S. Dion performed it at the 2002 Billboard Latin Music Awards, where she received a special award for her hit "My Heart Will Go On" which was the first English-language song to top Billboards Hot Latin Tracks.
An English version titled "Love Still Exists" was also confirmed by Dion to have been recorded for this album, but in Dion's words it did not sound well phonetically, so they included the Spanish version in the album instead.

A critical review of A New Day Has Come on Canoe.ca stated, "there's even a bit of Spanish frippery called Aun Existe Amor, which one can safely assume is also about love". Chuck Taylor from Billboard claimed the song to be a highlight in A New Day Has Come.

Track listings and formats1991 Canadian promotional single"L'amour existe encore" – 3:501994 French CD, cassette and 12" single"L'amour existe encore" – 3:49
"Le monde est stone" – 3:412002 US promotional single'''
"Aun Existe Amor" – 3:52

Charts

Release history

Cover versions
In 1994, co-songwriter Riccardo Cocciante released an Italian-language version of this song on his album Un Uomo Felice entitled "L'amore esiste ancora (con Tosca)". In 1998, Hélène Ségara and Garou performed this song as a duet for the charity album Ensemble contre le sida. In 2009, Lara Fabian also recorded this track for her album Toutes les femmes en moi as a tribute to all the women in the French music scene that have inspired her over the years, being this recording a humble hommage to Céline Dion. In 2010, Nicola Ciccone recorded and released the Italian version of this song for his album Imaginaire'' also entitled "L'amore esiste ancora" after performing the version for Luc Plamondon in homage and being told by the songwriter how beautiful it was, with such depth, when sung in Italian.

References

External links

1991 singles
1991 songs
2002 singles
Celine Dion songs
Columbia Records singles
French-language songs
Pop ballads
Songs with lyrics by Luc Plamondon
Songs written by Riccardo Cocciante
Spanish-language songs